Date My Dad is a Canadian-American comedy-drama television series starring Barry Watson as a single father raising three daughters. It was broadcast on Up TV in the United States from June 2 to July 28, 2017. It aired on the W Network in Canada.

Premise
The show is about Ricky Cooper, a former professional baseball player, who, years after the death of his wife Isabella, begins dating for the first time in twenty years, in addition to raising his three daughters: Mirabel, Elisa, and Gigi.

Cast
 Barry Watson as Ricky Cooper
 Zenia Marshall as Mirabel, Ricky's oldest daughter
 Lilah Fitzgerald as Elisa, Ricky's middle daughter
 Audrey Smallman as Gigi, Ricky's youngest daughter
 Raquel Welch as Rosa, Ricky's mother-in-law

Production
Filming began in Vancouver, British Columbia, Canada on April 12, 2017.

Episodes

References

External links

W Network website

2017 Canadian television series debuts
2017 American television series debuts
2010s American comedy-drama television series
2010s Canadian comedy-drama television series
English-language television shows
Television shows filmed in Vancouver
Television series about families
W Network original programming